Ghulam Hussain Saba Dashtyari (1954 – 1 June 2011) (Balochi: صبا دشتیاری بلوچ) commonly known as "Saba Dashtyari", was a professor of Islamic Studies at the University of Balochistan in Quetta, Balochistan.

Early life
Dashtyari was born to middle class family in 1953 in Lyari district of Karachi, Pakistan. He received Master of Arts degrees in Philosophy and Islamic Studies. He was fluent in Urdu, English, Persian and Arabic.

Career

Dashtyari was a teacher of Islamic Studies at the Balochistan University and frequently shuttled between Karachi and Quetta.

His literary contributions include more than 24 books on Balochi literature, history, poetry and translations. He also established the Syed Zahoor Shah Hashmi reference library, library on Balochi literature, in Malir area of Karachi.

The library houses more than 150,000 books in various languages on Balochi literature, culture and civilisation. Furthermore, he also compiled an index and bibliography of Balochi literature published in the past 50 years.

Death
On Wednesday June 1, 2011, Dashtyari was badly wounded when an unidentified assailant opened fire on him. He was rushed to hospital but died of his injuries.

References

Balochi-language writers
People from Karachi
Academic staff of the University of Balochistan
Baloch people
People murdered in Balochistan, Pakistan
1953 births
2011 deaths
Deaths by firearm in Balochistan, Pakistan
Assassinated Pakistani people